Tartu Department Store is a shopping mall in Tartu, Estonia. The mall belongs to Tallinna Kaubamaja Grupp.

The mall was built in 2005. In 2013, a new children's and home world was opened in Tartu Kaubamaja. In 2015–16, the mall was renovated.

References

External links

2005 establishments in Estonia
Buildings and structures in Tartu
Shopping centres in Estonia
Shopping malls established in 2005
Tourist attractions in Tartu